Patricia E. Bovey (born May 15, 1948) is a Canadian art historian from Manitoba. Bovey was the director of the Art Gallery of Greater Victoria (1980–1999) and the Winnipeg Art Gallery (1999–2004); art consultant (2004–2016); founder and director/curator, Buhler Gallery, St Boniface Hospital (2007–2016); past chair of the board of governors of the University of Manitoba and a former member of the board of trustees for the National Gallery of Canada. She also sat on the board of the Canada Council for the Arts. She was appointed director emerita, Winnipeg Art Gallery (2014).

On October 27, 2016, Bovey was named to the Senate of Canada by Prime Minister Justin Trudeau.  Bovey assumed her seat on November 10, 2016 as a member of the Independent Senators Group. On May 8, 2020, Bovey left the ISG and joined the Progressive Senate Group.

References

External links

 

1948 births
Art museum people
Canadian art historians
Canadian senators from Manitoba
Women members of the Senate of Canada
Independent Canadian senators
Living people
21st-century Canadian politicians
21st-century Canadian women politicians
Independent Senators Group
Women art historians
Canadian women historians